Isa Rahunen (born 16 April 1993) is a Finnish retired ice hockey player, currently serving as a linesman in the Naisten Liiga. She represented Finland with the national ice hockey team in numerous international competitions and won a silver medal at the 2019 IIHF Women's World Championship and bronze medals at the 2017 IIHF Women's World Championship, the women's ice hockey tournament at the 2018 Winter Olympic Games, and at the Four Nations Cup in 2018.

Rahunen announced her retirement from the national team and from top level club competition after the 2019–20 Naisten Liiga season, citing a desire to focus more fully on her career as a nurse at the Oulu University Hospital. However, she returned to the Naisten Liiga as an active player for a short stint during the later part of the 2020–21 season.

References

External links
 
 
 

1993 births
Living people
People from Kuopio
Finnish women's ice hockey defencemen
Oulun Kärpät Naiset players
KalPa Naiset players
Olympic ice hockey players of Finland
Olympic bronze medalists for Finland
Olympic medalists in ice hockey
Ice hockey players at the 2018 Winter Olympics
Medalists at the 2018 Winter Olympics
Sportspeople from North Savo